Tiucetus is an extinct genus of cetotheriid baleen whale known from the Late Miocene Pisco Formation of Peru.

Description 
Tiucetus is distinct from other cetotheriids in having a squamosal cleft; from eomysticetids in having comparatively short nasals, a more anteriorly projected supraoccipital and parietal, and a tympanic bulla that is rotated so that the inner posterior prominence faces dorsally.

Classification 
Tiucetus falls basally in Cetotheriidae, less derived than Joumocetus and Cephalotropis.

Palaeogeography 
Other marine mammals found in the Pisco Formation include another cetotheriid, Piscobalaena, the odd dolphin Odobenocetops, the killer sperm whale Acrophyseter, the long-necked seal Acrophoca, and aquatic sloth Thalassocnus.

References 

Baleen whales
Prehistoric cetacean genera
Miocene mammals of South America
Neogene Peru
Fossils of Peru
Fossil taxa described in 2017